The 2003 Dartmouth Big Green football team was an American football team that represented Dartmouth College during the 2003 NCAA Division I-AA football season. Dartmouth tied for second in the Ivy League.

In their 12th season under head coach John Lyons, the Big Green compiled a 5–5 record and were outscored 261 to 211. Casey Cramer and Clayton Smith were the team captains.

The Big Green's 4–3 conference record placed them in a four-way tie for second in the Ivy League standings. Despite its winning conference record, Dartmouth was outscored 168 to 161 by Ivy opponents.

Dartmouth played its home games at Memorial Field on the college campus in Hanover, New Hampshire.

Schedule

References

Dartmouth
Dartmouth Big Green football seasons
Dartmouth Big Green football